Fowlie Glacier is a tributary glacier,  long, in the Admiralty Mountains of Victoria Land, Antarctica. From a common head with Dennistoun Glacier, it flows northwest between Mount Ajax and Mount Faget, entering the main flow of the Dennistoun Glacier at the southeast base of the Lyttelton Range. It was named after Walter Fowlie of the New Zealand Antarctic Division, a field assistant with a New Zealand Antarctic Research Programme geological party to this area, 1981–82, led by R.H. Findlay. The original application of the name was revised in 1994 in relation to Dennistoun Glacier. This glacier lies situated on the Pennell Coast, a portion of Antarctica lying between Cape Williams and Cape Adare.

References 

Glaciers of Pennell Coast